Kristmundur Numi Fridfinnson (June 14, 1898 – November 10, 1938) was an Icelandic-Canadian ice hockey player who competed in the 1920 Summer Olympics. He was born in Baldur, Manitoba. Fridfinnson was the rover for the Winnipeg Falcons, the Canadian team in the 1920 Olympics, and scored the winning goal in the game which decided the gold medal, a game the Canadians won 12-1.

Personal life
Fridfinnson was born in 1898 to Icelandic immigrants Jón Friðfinnsson and Anna Sigríður Jónsdóttir. He died in Selkirk, Manitoba.

Awards and achievements
Allan Cup Championship (1920)

References

External links
 
Falcons

1898 births
1938 deaths
Burials at Brookside Cemetery (Winnipeg)
Canadian people of Icelandic descent
Ice hockey people from Manitoba
Ice hockey players at the 1920 Summer Olympics
Medalists at the 1920 Summer Olympics
Olympic gold medalists for Canada
Olympic ice hockey players of Canada
Olympic medalists in ice hockey
Winnipeg Falcons players